Systems science is an interdisciplinary field of science that studies the nature of complex systems in nature, society, and science. It aims to develop interdisciplinary foundations, which are applicable in a variety of areas, such as engineering, biology, medicine and social sciences.

Systems sciences covers formal sciences fields like complex systems, cybernetics, dynamical systems theory, and systems theory, and applications in the field of the natural and social sciences and engineering, such as control theory, operations research, social systems theory, systems biology, systems dynamics, systems ecology, systems engineering and systems psychology.



A 
 Advances in Systems Science and Applications
 Annals of Systems Research: from 1971 until 1978
 Annual Review of Ecology, Evolution, and Systematics

B 
 Behavioral Science: from 1956 until 1996, then became Systems Research and Behavioral Science

C 
 Complex Systems
 Complexity

E 
 Ecological Complexity
 European Journal of Information Systems

G 
 General Systems Yearbook: from 1956 until 1987, and then published in Systems Research and Behavioral Science

I 
 IEEE Intelligent Systems
 IEEE Transactions on Systems, Man, and Cybernetics
 IEEE Transactions on Control Systems Technology
 Information Systems Research
 Interdisciplinary Description of Complex Systems
 Interfaces: An International Journal of the Institute for Operations Research and the Management Science
 International Journal of General Systems

J 
 Journal of the Association for Information Systems
 Journal of Computer and System Sciences
 Journal of Environmental Engineering
 Journal of Management Information Systems
 Journal of Research Practice
 Journal of Systems and Software

M 
 Mathematics of Operations Research

S 
 Systems Research and Behavioral Science: since 1996, formed from Behavioral Science (1956–1996) and Systems Research (1984–1995)

See also 
 List of systems engineering at universities
 List of systems engineering books
 List of systems scientists

External links 
 List of journals, International Society for Systems Science, 2007
 Cybernetics and Systems Journals, Principia Cybernetica Web, 2005
 Journals Related to Cybernetics, American Society for Cybernetics, 1997

Systems science